Michael Finney is a professional magician. He was born in 1954 in Woodland, California. He moved to Phoenix, Arizona in 1978. He has appeared on numerous television specials and performs regularly throughout the U.S. He has appeared on the cover of The Linking Ring.

Biography
After spending part of his early career as a close-up magician and a children's performer at a theme park, Finney decided to concentrate strictly on comedy magic.

Once a comedy finalist on the television program Star Search, Finney was nominated for 'Magician of the Year' by the Magic Castle nightclub in Los Angeles, performed at the 2004 Inaugural Gala for President George W Bush, and received the Silver Lion Head award for excellence in comedy and magic from magicians Siegfried and Roy.

NBC
Once a regular performer on NBC's World's Greatest Magicians and World's Wildest Magic shows, Finney now performs primarily one day corporate events, charity events, and at casinos.

Finney is one of only a few magicians with their own foundation —- the Michael Finney Foundation to benefit firefighters and the Pappas School for homeless children. In eight years, his foundation donated over $400,000 to his causes, according to Finney's estimate. He stated in a recent interview that he is now also associated with the Gift of Life, a Rotarian group that provides assistance and operations for children with heart problems. He is currently involved with the Wounded Warriors program, having contributed almost a million dollars through his foundation.

References 
https://www.theaquarian.com/2014/02/19/interview-with-masters-of-illusion-up-to-new-tricks/

External links
 Official homepage
 Interview with Michael Finney

1954 births
Living people
American magicians
Academy of Magical Arts Parlour Magician of the Year winners